Hakai may refer to:

Hakai (novel), 1906 novel by Tōson Shimazaki
Hakai (film), 1948 Japanese film, second of three films of the novel
Hakai (album), by Japanese vocalist Wagdug Futuristic Unity 2008
Hakai Institute on the Great Bear Rainforest
Hakai Magazine